

GG 300, President Kennedy's Limousine License Plate Number 
 "GG 300", a track on the Able Tasmans 1995 album Store in a Cool Place
 GG 300, the registration plate of the presidential limousine used during the assassination of John F. Kennedy